Katarapko may refer to any of the following places in South Australia:

Hundred of Katarapko , a cadastral unit  
Katarapko, South Australia, a locality
Katarapko Game Reserve, a former protected area  
Katarapko Island, an island within the Murray River in South Australia

See also
Katarapko Wood Camp, a World War II prisoner of war camp